County palace is a building of Office of Public Administration in Osijek-Baranja County in Osijek, Croatia. It was formerly used as a seat of County Assembly of Osijek-Baranja County, hence the name.

History 

It was designed by Nikola Hild and built since 1840 to 1846.

References 

Government buildings completed in 1846
Buildings and structures in Osijek
Palaces in Croatia
1846 establishments in the Austrian Empire